VSU is an abbreviation that (among other things) can stand for:

Valdosta State University
Venstresocialisternes Ungdom
Vikrama Simhapuri University
Violence Suppression Unit 
Virginia State University
Visayas State University
Voluntary student unionism
Voronezh State University